Franziska L. Emmerling (born 1975) is a German chemist. Emmerling is Head of Department 1 Analytical Sciences and Reference Materials, and Head of Division 1.3 Structural Analysis at the German Federal Institute for Materials Research and Testing (BAM). She is a privatdozent at Humboldt University.

Early life and education 
Emmerling was born in Bad Dürkheim. She studied chemistry at Albert-Ludwig University, and completed her PhD at the same institution in 2003. Her doctoral work focused on the synthesis and structural investigation of intermetallic phases and ternary oxides of the elements arsenic, antimony and bismuth in unusual valence states.

Research and career 
Emmerling conducted post-doctoral research in the group of Prof. Claudia Felser at Johannes Gutenberg University in Mainz. In 2005, Emmerling moved to the Federal Institute for Materials Research and Testing (BAM) in Berlin as head of the working group on X-ray structure analysis. From 2010 until 2013 she held a guest professorship in inorganic chemistry at Humboldt University in Berlin. In 2012 Emmerling became Head of the Division ‘Structure Analysis’ at BAM, before becoming Head of Department Analytical Sciences and Reference Materials in 2017.
Emmerling achieved her habilitation in chemistry in 2018 focusing on in situ analysis of mechanochemical reaction.

The current work of Emmerling focuses on the investigation of crystallization and aggregation phenomena by means of synchrotron radiation. She is also well known for her advances in mechanochemistry and for developing new methods to monitor mechanochemical reactions in situ. Emmerling develops and uses time-resolved experiments applying synchrotron X-rays, supplemented with additional analytic methods including Raman spectroscopy and XANES.

In 2019, Emmerling was elected as a member of the Analytical Chemistry Division of the International Union of Pure and Applied Chemistry (IUPAC)

References 

1975 births
Living people